This is a list of Acts of the Parliament of Scotland.  It lists the Acts of Parliament of the old Parliament of Scotland, that was merged with the old Parliament of England to form the Parliament of Great Britain, by the Union with England Act 1707.

The numbers after the titles of the Acts are the chapter numbers. Acts are referenced using 'Year of reign', 'Monarch', c, 'Chapter number' — e.g. 16 Charles II c 2 — to define a chapter of the appropriate statute book. Chapter numbers given in the duodecimo edition, where applicable, are given in square brackets.

This list is only a partial catalogue of Acts that remained on the statute books even after the Union of 1707. For a largely comprehensive edition of Scottish Acts of Parliament see Acts of the Parliaments of Scotland, ed. Thomas Thomson. A new edition has been edited by the Scottish Parliament Project at the University of St Andrews and is available online as the Records of the Parliaments of Scotland.

For the period after 1707, see list of Acts of the Parliament of Great Britain.

15th century

1424
Record ed: 26 May
Church Act 1424 (c 1) [12mo ed: 1424 c 1] (.) This Act was repealed because it was superseded by 1425 c 1.
Public Peace Act 1424 (c 2) [12mo ed: 1424 c 2] (Of pece to be kepit throu the realme.)
Treason Act 1424 (c 3) [12mo ed: 1424 c 3] (.)
Treason Act 1424 (c 4) [12mo ed: 1424 c 4] (.)
Riders and Gangers Act 1424 (c 5) [12mo ed: 1424 c 5] (Of ridaris and gangaris throu the cuntre.)
Officers of Law Act 1424 (c 6) [12mo ed: 1424 c 6] (Of the ministeris and officiaris of law throu the realme.)
Sorners Act 1424 (c 7) [12mo ed: 1424 c 7] (Of sornaris.)
Customs and Burgh Mails Act 1424 (c 8) (.)
Crown Revenues Act 1424 (c 9) [12mo ed: 1424 c 9] (.)
Supply Act 1424 (c 10) (.)
Salmon Act 1424 (c 11) [12mo ed: 1424 c 10] (.)
Salmon Act 1424 (c 12) [12mo ed: 1424 c 11] (.) This Act related to "cruives and yairs, i.e. salmon traps and salmon yards or dams".
Royal Mines Act 1424 (c 13) [12mo ed: 1424 c 12] (still in force)
Clergy Act 1424 (c 14) [12mo ed: 1424 c 13] (.) 
Clergy Act 1424 (c 15) [12mo ed: 1424 c 14] (Of clerkis purchessand pensionis out of beneficis.)
. (c 16) [12mo ed: 1424 c 15]
Of strangeris that sellis merchandise in the realme and takis mone tharfor. (c 17) [12mo ed: 1424 c 16] 
Football Act 1424 (Of playing at the fut ball.) (c 18) [12mo ed: 1424 c 17]
Archers Act 1424 (c 19) [12mo ed: 1424 c 18] (.)
Rooks Act 1424 (c 20) [12mo ed: 1424 c 19] (Of rukis biggande in treis.)
Muirburn Act 1424 (c 21) [12mo ed: 1424 c 20]. (Of murbyrne).
Of the custum of hors nolt scheip and hering. (c 22) [12mo ed: 1424 c 21]
Of the custum of mertrik skynnis and other furringis. (c 23) [12mo ed: 1424 c 22]
Coinage Act 1424 (c 24) [12mo ed: 1424 c 23] (Of the amending of the mone.)
 Innkeepers Act 1424 (c 25) [12mo ed: 1424 c 24] (Of hostilaris in burowis townis and thruchfaris) (Repealed by the Statute Law (Repeals) Act 1989 (c 43))
Of the age and mark of beggars and of idle men. [12mo ed: 1424 c 25]
Anent the complaynt of Maister Nicholl of Cumnok apone Maister Ingrem Lindissay that he purchest in the court of Rome ane pensione out of the denry of Abirdene. (c 26)
Supply Act 1424 (c 27) (Of the chevisance to be maide in Flanderis for payment of the finance for the kingis costage.)

Record ed: 12 March 1424 (old style) [which is 1425 (new style)]
Of the fredome of the halykirk. (c 1) [12mo ed: 1424 c 26]
Anent hospitalis. (c 2) [12mo ed: 1424 c 27]
Lollard Act (c 3) [12mo ed: 1424 c 28] (Anontis heretikis and lollardis.)
Observance of Statutes Act 1425  (c 4) [12mo ed: 1424 c 29] (Anent the keping of the statutis maid in the kingis first parliament.)
Leagues Act 1425 (c 5) [12mo ed: 1424 c 30] (Anent ligis and bandis.)
Trade in Flanders Act 1424 (c 6) (Of merchandis passand in Flanderis.)
Horses Act 1425 (c 7) [12mo ed: 1424 c 31] (Of the selling of hors.)
Tallow Act 1425 (c 8) [12mo ed: 1424 c 32] (Anent talch.)
Of the pricis of vittallis. (c 9)
Theft of Green Wood Act 1424 or 1425 (c 10) [12mo ed: 1424 c 33] (Of the steyllaris of greene wode and brekaris of orchardis.)
Stolen Wood Act 1424 or 1425 (c 11) [12mo ed: 1424 c 34] (Of stollyn wode fundyn in uthir lordis landis.)
Salmon Act 1424 (c 12) (Anentis salmonde.)
Deer Act 1424 or 1425 (c 13) [12mo ed: 1424 c 36]. (Anent stalkiris that slais deir.)
Reset Act 1424 or 1425 (c 14) (Of resettouris of theffis and reffaris.)
Treason Act 1425 (c 15) [12mo ed: 1424 c 37] (Of resettouris of rebellouris.)
Of merchandis passand our the see. (c 16) [12mo ed: 1424 c 38]
Deacons of Crafts Act 1424 or 1425 (c 17). (Of dekynis of craftis.) Repealed by 1427 c 4 [12mo: c 86].
Anent the ordinance of processionis and prayeris for the king the quen and thar barntyme. (c 18)
Customs Act 1424 (c 19) [12mo ed: 1424 c 40] (Of the custum of wollyn clayth.)
Labourers Act 1425 (c 20) [12mo ed: 1424 c 41] (Anent the laboraris of the erd.)
Beggars Act 1424 (c 21) [12mo ed: 1424 c 42] (Of thiggaris.)
Leasing Making Act 1424 or 1425 (c 22) [12mo ed: 1424 c 43] (Anent lesing makaris.)
Wapinschaws Act 1424 (c 23) [12mo ed: 1424 c 44] (Of wapynschawingis.)
Poor's Counsel Act 1424 or 1425 (c 24) [12mo ed: 1424 c 45]. (Anent billis of complayntis.) Repealed by section 17(5) of, and Part I of the Eighth Schedule to, the Legal Aid (Scotland) Act 1949 (that is to say, the Legal Aid and Solicitors (Scotland) Act 1949). Repealed again by Part XII of Schedule 1 to the Statute Law (Repeals) Act 1973.
Remissions Act 1424 (c 25) [12mo ed: 1424 c 46] (Anent remissionis to be gevyn.)

1425
Record ed: 11 March 1425 (old style) [which is 1426 (new style)]
Church Act 1425 (c 1) (Of the fredom of the haly kirk.)
Armour to be Imported Act 1426 (c 2) [12mo ed: 1425 c 47] (Anent harnes and armouris to be brocht hame be merchandis.)
Law of the Land Act 1425 or 1426 (c 3) [12mo ed: 1425 c 48] (Under quhat lawis the kingis liegis salbe governyt.)
Registration of King's Letters Act 1426 (c 4) (Anent the registracione of lotteris of newe infeftment, confirmacion, &c.)
Of the halding of the mone within the realme. (c 5) [12mo ed: 1425 c 49]
Of thame that may not gang apon assise. (c 6) [12mo ed: 1425 c 50]
Forethought Felony Act 1425 (c 7) [12mo ed: 1425 c 51] (Of forthocht felony.)
Attendance in Parliament Act 1425 or 1426 (c 8) [12mo ed: 1425 c 52] (Of presens in the Parliament.)
Attorneys Act 1425 (c 9) [12mo ed: 1425 c 53] (Of attournayis in the Justice ayr.)
Statute Law Revision Act 1425 or 1426 (c 10) [12mo ed: 1425 cc 54 and 55] (Of personis to be chosyn to examyn and mend the bukis of law of this realme.)
Travellers Act 1425 (c 11) [12mo ed: 1425 c 56] (Anent hostelaris in boroustounis and throuchfaris.)
Of orisones to be maid for the king the queyn and thare childer. (c 12)
Anent mesuris. (c 13) [12mo ed: 1425 c 59]
Anent wechtis. (c 14)
Of watter mettis. (c 15) [12mo ed: 1425 c 57]
Ferries Act 1425 (c 16) [12mo ed: 1425 c 58] (Anent batemen and feriaris.)
Wapinschaws Act 1425 (c 17) [12mo ed: 1425 c 60] (Of wapinschawingis.)
Ordinance anent the passage betuix Scotlande and Irlande. (c 18) [12mo ed: 1425 cc 61 to 64]
Lords of the Session Act 1425 or 1426 or the Lords of Session Act 1425 (c 19) [12mo ed: 1425 c 65] (Of the Sessionis to be haldin.)
Poor Act 1425 or 1426 (c 20) [12mo ed: 1425 c 66] (Anent inquisicion to be maid of ydil men that has nocht of thare awin to leif upon.)
Proclamation of Acts of Parliament Act 1425 or 1426 (c 21) [12mo ed: 1425 c 67] (Of the registracione and proclamacione of the actis of parliament.)
Assisa de ponderibus et mensuris. (c 22) [12mo ed: 1426 cc 68 to 70]
Fire in Towns Act 1425 or 1426 (c 23) [12mo ed: 1426 cc 71 to 75] (Anentis fyre in townis.)

1426
Record ed: 30 September
Anent the custum of salmondis and uthir fische. (c 1) [12mo ed: 1426 c 76]
Deacons of Crafts Act 1426 (c 2) (Of the dekynis of craftis.) Repealed by 1427 c 4 [12mo: c 86].
Craftsmen's Work Act 1426 (c 3) [12mo ed: 1426 c 78] (Of the price of the werk maid by craftismen.)
Wages Act 1426 (c 4) [12mo ed: 1426 c 79] (Of the fee of werkmen.)
Workmen Act 1426 (c 5) [12mo ed: 1426 c 80] (Of the punicion of werkmen that fulfillis nocht thar werk at the tyme thai hecht.)
Anent the sawing of quhete peis and benis. (c 6) [12mo ed: 1426 c 81]
Castles Act 1426 (c 7) [12mo ed: 1426 c 82] (Anent the biggyn and reparelling of castellis and maner placis beyonde the mownth.)

1427
Record ed: 1 July
Oaths Act 1427 (c 1) [12mo ed: 1426 c 83] (De juramento auditorum ad causas et querelas terminandas.)
Travellers Abroad Act 1427 (c 2) [12mo ed: 1426 c 84] (De financia facienda per clericos aut laicos ad partes ultramarinas se transferentes.)
Travellers Act 1427 (c 3) [12mo ed: 1426 c 85] (De hostellaris seu hospiciis publicis.) 
Deacons of Crafts Act 1427 (c 4) [12mo ed: 1426 c 86] (Revocacio ordinacionum super artificum decapis.)
Spiritual Court Procedure Act 1427 (c 5) [12mo ed: 1426 c 87] (Pro expedicione litium in curia spirituali.)
Arbitration Act 1427 (c 6) [12mo ed: 1426 c 87] (De arbitriis.)
De excepcionibus falsis et frivolis. (c 7)
Jurisdiction over Scotsmen Dying Abroad Act 1427 (c 8) [12mo ed: 1426 c 88] (De causis mercatorum extra regnum decedencium tractandis)

Record ed: 1 March 1427 (old style) [which is 1428 (new style)]
Of thaim that has oute of the realme merchandice nocht payande the custum. (c 1) [12mo ed: 1427 c 100]
Members of Parliament Act 1427 or 1428 Of the commissaris of the schiris and the commoun spekar of the parliament. (c 2) [12mo ed: 1427 c 101]
Craftsmen Act 1427 (c 3) [12mo ed: 1427 c 102] (Anentis the men of craftis in burowis.)
Beggars Act 1427 (c 4) [12mo ed: 1427 c 103] (Adicioun to the statut of beggaris.)
Wolves Act 1427 (c 5) [12mo ed: 1427 c 104] (That baronis ger seik the quhelpis of the wolfis and sla thame.)
Of cruffis in waterris. (c 6)
Shipping Act 1427 or 1428 (c 7) (The leife to merchandis to fure thar gudis in schippis of vther cuntries.)
Lepers Act 1427 (c 8) [12mo ed: 1427 c 105] (Anent lipper folk.)
Barratry Act 1427 or 1428 (c 9) [12mo ed: 1427 c 106] (Anent the passage of clerkis out of the realme.)
Attendance at Courts Act 1427 (c 10) (That na man cum to courtis with gaddering.)
Interpretation of Acts Act 1427 or 1428 (c 11)  [12mo ed: 1427 c 107] (Anent interpreting the kingis statutis.)
Wild Birds Act 1427 (c 12) [12mo ed: 1427 c 108] (Anent wylde foulis.)

1428
Record ed: 12 July, vol 2, p 17
Oath by Queen Act 1428 [12mo ed: 1428 c 109] (De juramento prestando Domine Regine)

1429
Record ed: 26 April
De fugientibus a Rege vel alio quocunque ejus locum tenente. (c 1) [12mo ed: 1429 c 110]
De colonis pro anno futuro non removendis. (c 2) 

Record ed: 6 March
Of mayris of fee. (c 1) [12mo ed: 1429 c 111]
Of summondis. (c 2) [12mo ed: 1429 c 112]
Anent excepcionis agane the kingis breifis (c 3) [12mo ed: 1429 c 113] 
Of essonyeis. (c 4) [12mo ed: 1429 c 114]
Of borghis fundyn be defendouris apon a weir of law and thar fredome to be avisit. (c 5) [12mo ed: 1429 c 115]
Of falsing of domis. (c 6) [12mo ed: 1429 c 116]
Of recounteris and of the absens of the partiis at the dome geving of the docrete. (c 7) [12mo ed: 1429 c 117]
Of the array of knychtis lordis vtheris. (c 8)  [12mo ed: 1429 c 118]
Of the array of burgessis and their wyffis. (c 9)
Of the array of yemen and commonis to landwartis. (c 10)
Anent the maner of grathing of gentilmen and utheris for weir. (c 11) [12mo ed: 1429 c 120]
Anent the maner of grathing of yemen for weir. (c 12) [12mo ed: 1429 c 121]
Of unlawis to be raisit of thaim nocht bodyn as is before wryttin. (c 13) [12mo ed: 1429 c 122]
 Lawburrows Act 1429 (c 20) [12mo ed: 1429 c 129] (see Lawburrows) (still in force)

1449
 Leases Act 1449 (c 6) [12mo ed: 1449 c 18] (still in force)

1469
 Reversion Act 1469 (c 3) [12mo ed: 1469 c 27] (Ceases to have effect under the Title Conditions (Scotland) Act 2003)
 Prescription Act 1469 (c 4) [12mo ed: 1469 c 28]
 Diligence Act 1469 (c 12) [12mo ed: 1469 c 36] (still in force)

1474
 Tutors Act 1474 (c 6) [12mo ed: c 51] (repealed by the Age of Legal Capacity (Scotland) Act 1991)
 Prescription Act 1474 (c 9) [12mo ed: c 54]

1487
 Royal Burghs Act 1487 (c 17) [12mo ed: c 111] (see royal burghs) (still in force)

1491
 Liferent Caution Act 1491 (c 6) [12mo ed: c 25] (still in force)
 Leases Act 1491 (c 7) (still in force)
 Common Good Act 1491 (c 19) [12mo ed: c 36] (still in force)

1496
 Education Act 1496 (c 87) (see also Education in Scotland)

16th century

1503
 Spuilzie Act 1503 (c 9) [12mo ed: c 65]
 Diligence Act 1503 (c 45) [12mo ed: c 98] (repealed by section 108 of, and Schedule 8 to, the Debtors (Scotland) Act 1987)

1532
 College of Justice Act 1532 (c 2) [12mo ed: cc 36–41] (still in force)

1535
 Liferent Caution Act 1535 (c 14) [12mo ed: c 15] (still in force)

1540
 Act of Sederunt 1540 (c 93)

Record ed: 3 December
 Citation Act 1540 (c 10) [12mo ed: c 75] (still in force)

Record ed: 14 March
 College of Justice Act 1540 (c 10) [12mo ed: c 93] (still in force)
 Judges Act 1540 (c 22) [12mo ed: c 104]
 Subscription of Deeds Act 1540 (c 37) [12mo ed: c 117] (repealed by 1995 c 7))

1555
 Lands Redemption Act 1555 (c 3) [12mo ed: c 30] (still in force)
 Citation Act 1555 (c 6) [12mo ed: c 33] (repealed by section 1(1) of, and Group 4 of Part I of Schedule 1 to, the Statute Law (Repeals) Act 1986)

1560
 Confession of Faith Ratification Act 1560 (c 1) (still in force)
 Papal Jurisdiction Act 1560 (c 2) (still in force)

1563
Anentis Witchcrafts. Anent the using of witchcraftis sorsarie and necromancie. (c 9) (Witchcraft Act 1563)
Anent mesouris and wechtis. (c 14)
 Notaries Act 1563 (c 17)  [12mo ed: c 79]

1567
Anent the demissioun of the Crowne in favouris of our Soverane lord and his Majesteis coronatioun. (c 1) (Act Anent the demission of the Crown in favour of our Sovereign Lord, and his Majesty's Coronation 1567)
 Coronation Oath Act 1567 (c 8) [12mo ed: c 8] (still in force)
 Church Jurisdiction Act 1567 (c 12) (still in force)
 Incest Act 1567 (c 15) [12mo ed: c 14] 
 Marriage Act 1567 (c 16) [12mo ed: c 15]

1578
 Burghs Act 1578 (c 11) [12mo ed: c 64](see burgh) (still in force)

1579
 Church Act 1579 (c 6) [12mo ed: c 68]
 Church Jurisdiction Act 1579 (c 7) [12mo ed: c 69]
 Sunday Act 1579 (c 8) [12mo ed: c 70]
For punishment of the strang and ydle beggaris and releif of the pure and impotent. (c 12) [12mo ed: c 74] (Act for Punishment of Strong and Idle Beggars, and Relief of the Poor and Impotent)
 Registration Act 1579 (c 13) [12mo ed: c 75] 
 Criminal Letters Act 1579 (c 16) [12mo ed: c 78] (still in force)
 Subscription of Deeds Act 1579 (c 18) [12mo ed: c 80] (repealed by 1995 c 7)
 Prescription (Ejections) Act 1579 (c 19) [12mo ed: c 81]
 Prescription Act 1579 (c 21) [12mo ed: c 83]
 Hornings Act 1579 (c 45) [12mo ed: c 94]

1581
 Stipends Act 1581 (c 2) [12mo ed: c 100]
 Lawburrows Act 1581 (c 22) [12mo ed: c 117] (still in force)
 Breach of Arrestment Act 1581 (c 23) [12mo ed: c 118] (still in force)
 Convention of Burghs Act 1581 (c 26) [12mo ed: c 119]

1584
 Sovereignty Act 1584 (c 2) [12mo ed: c 129] (still in force)
 Unlawful Jurisdictions Act 1584 (c 4) [12mo ed: c 131] (still in force)
 Disqualification of Ministers Act 1584 (c 6) [12mo ed: c 133] (still in force)
 Execution of Decrees Act 1584 (c 15) [12mo ed: c 139]
 Decrees in Absence Act 1584 (c 10) [12mo ed: c 3] (repealed by the Bankruptcy and Diligence etc. (Scotland) Act 2007)

1585
 Curators Act 1585 (c 25) [12mo ed: c 18] (repealed by the Adults with Incapacity (Scotland) Act 2000)

1587
 Officers of Arms Act 1587 (c 30) [12mo ed: c 46]
 Tolls Act 1587 (c 37) [12mo ed: c 54] (still in force)
 Jurors Act 1587 (c 54) [12mo ed: cc 75 and 77]
 Criminal Justice Act 1587 (c 57) [12mo ed: cc 91 and 92]
 Burghs Act 1587 (c 114) [12mo ed: c 113] (still in force)

1592
 General Assembly Act 1592 (c 8) [12mo ed: c 116] (see General Assembly of the Church of Scotland) (still in force)
 Deposition of Ministers Act 1592 (c 9) [12mo ed: c 117]
 Lyon King of Arms Act 1592 (c 29) [12mo ed: c 127] (see Lyon King of Arms) (still in force)
 Mines and Metals Act 1592 (c 31) (still in force)
 Citation Act 1592 (c 59) [12mo ed: c 141] (still in force)
 Compensation Act 1592 (c 61) [12mo ed: c 143] (still in force)
 Expenses Act 1592 (c 62) [12mo ed: c 144] (still in force)
 Deforcement Act 1592 (c 72) [12mo ed: c 152] (still in force)

1593
 Hornings Act 1593 (c 34) [12mo ed: c 181]

1594
 Declinature Act 1594 (c 22) (repealed by the Court of Session Act 1988)
 Prescription Act 1594 (c 24) [12mo ed: c 218] 
 Land Purchase Act 1594 (c 26) [12mo ed: c 220] (still in force)
 Ejection Caution Act 1594 (c 27)  (repealed by the Bankruptcy and Diligence etc. (Scotland) Act 2007)
 Parricide Act 1594 (c 30) [12mo ed: c 224] (repealed by the Succession (Scotland) Act 2016)

1597
 Kirk Dykes Act 1597 (c 3) [12mo ed: c 232] (see kirk, dyke) (still in force)
 Feu-duty Act 1597 (c 17) [12mo ed: c 250] (see feu duty) (repealed by the Abolition of Feudal Tenure etc. (Scotland) Act 2000)
 Lawburrows Act 1597 (c 40) [12mo ed: c 273] (see Lawburrows) (still in force)

17th century

1600
 Hornings Act 1600 (c 22) [12mo ed: c 13]
 Crown Proceedings Act 1600 (c 23) [12mo ed: c 14] (still in force)

1606
 Sovereignty Act 1606 (c 1) [12mo ed: c 1] (see sovereignty) (still in force)
 Anent Coilyearis and Saltaris (c 2)

1607
 Theft Act 1607 (c 6) [12mo ed: c 3] (still in force)
 Convention of Burghs Act 1607 (c 13) [12mo ed: c 6]

1617
 Prescription Act 1617 (c 12) [12mo ed: c 12]
 Reduction Act 1617 (c 13) [12mo ed: c 13] 
 Executors Act 1617 (c 14) [12mo ed: c 14] (still in force)
 Registration Act 1617 (c 16) [12mo ed: c 16] (still in force)
 Arrestments Act 1617 (c 17) [12mo ed: c 17] (repealed by the Bankruptcy and Diligence etc. (Scotland) Act 2007)
 Dovecotes Act 1617 (c 19) [12mo ed: c 19]

1621
 Diligence Act 1621 (c 6) [12mo ed: c 6] (repealed by the Bankruptcy and Diligence etc. (Scotland) Act 2007)
 Adjudication Act 1621 (c 7) [12mo ed: c 7] (repealed by the Bankruptcy and Diligence etc. (Scotland) Act 2007)
 Bankruptcy Act 1621 (c 18) [12mo ed: c 18]
 Hornings Act 1621 (c 20) [12mo ed: c 20]
 Act Anent Hunting and Haulking (c 31)

1633
 Sovereignty Act 1633 (c 3) [12mo ed: c 3] (still in force)
 Education Act 1633 (Act V of XXXI in Legislation of 28 June 1633)

1646
 Education Act 1646

1661 
 Crown Appointments Act 1661 (c 6) [12mo ed: c 2] (still in force)
 Parliament Act 1661 (c 7) [12mo ed: c 3] (still in force)
 Prerogative Act 1661 (c 13) [12mo ed: c 5] (still in force)
 Act against the crime of Blasphemy 1661 (c 21)
 Messengers of Arms Act 1661 (c 47)
 Anent Coal-Hewers 1661 (c 56)
 Precedence Act 1661 (c 211) (still in force)
 Poinding Act 1661 (c 218) [12mo ed: c. 29] 
 Registration Act 1661 (c 243) [12mo ed: c 31] (repealed by the Abolition of Feudal Tenure etc. (Scotland) Act 2000))
 Bonds Act 1661 (c 244) [12mo ed: c 32] (still in force)
 Redemptions Act 1661 (c 247) (repealed by the Title Conditions (Scotland) Act 2003 (asp 9))
 Sunday Act 1661 (c 281) [12mo ed: c 18]
 Arrestments Act 1661 (c 283) [12mo ed: c 51] (still in force)
 March Dykes Act 1661 (c 284) [12mo ed: c 41] (still in force)
 Justices of the Peace Act 1661 (c 338) [12mo ed: c 38]
 Diligence Act 1661 (c 344) [12mo ed: c 62] (repealed by the Bankruptcy and Diligence etc. (Scotland) Act 2007)

1663
 Minority Act 1663 (c 4) [12mo ed: c 10] (repealed by the Bankruptcy and Diligence etc. (Scotland) Act 2007)
 Manses Act 1663 (c 31) [12mo ed: c 21]

1669
 Poinding Act 1669 (c 5) [12mo ed: c 4]
 Prescription Act 1669 (c 14) [12mo ed: c 9]
 Interruptions Act 1669 (c 15) [12mo ed: c 10]
 March Dykes Act 1669 (c 38) [12mo ed: c 17] (still in force)
 Lyon King of Arms Act 1669 (c 95) (still in force)

1672
 Tutors and Curators Act 1672 (c 2) [12mo ed: c 2] (repealed by the Age of Legal Capacity (Scotland) Act 1991)
 Summons Execution Act 1672 (c 6) [12mo ed: c 6]
 Writs Act 1672 (c 16) [12mo ed: c 7] (still in force)
 Ann Act 1672 (c 24) [12mo ed: c 13] (repealed by the Abolition of Feudal Tenure etc. (Scotland) Act 2000)
 Courts Act 1672 (c 40) [12mo ed: c 16] (still in force)
 Correction Houses Act 1672 (c --)
 Adjudications Act 1672 (c 45) [12mo ed: c 19] (repealed by the Bankruptcy and Diligence etc. (Scotland) Act 2007)
 Lyon King of Arms Act 1672 (c 47) [12mo ed: c 21]

1681
 Subscription of Deeds Act 1681 (c 5) [12mo ed: c 5] (repealed by Requirements of Writing (Scotland) Act 1995 (c. 7))
 Act anent Religion and the Test (c 6) (passed 31 August 1681)
 Declinature Act 1681 (c 79) [12mo ed: c 13] (still in force)
 Act against Assassinations (c 81)
 Judicial Sale Act 1681 (c 83) [12mo ed: c 17]
 Oaths of Minors Act 1681 (c 85) [12mo ed: c 19] (repealed by 1991 c 50)
 Bills of Exchange Act 1681 (c 86) [12mo ed: c 20] (still in force)
 Registration Act 1681

1685
 Prescription Act 1685 (c 14) [12mo ed: c 14] 
 Entail Act 1685 (c 26) [12mo ed: c 22] (repealed by Abolition of Feudal Tenure etc. (Scotland) Act 2000 (asp 5))

1686
 Interlocutors Act 1686 (c 4) [12mo ed: c 3]
 Citation Act 1686 (c 5) [12mo ed: c 4] (still in force)
 Winter Herding Act 1686 (c 21) [12mo ed: c 11]
 Evidence Act 1686 (c 30) [12mo ed: c 18]

1689
 Act declaring the Meeting of the Estates to be a Parliament (c. 1)
 Claim of Right (1689) (c 28) [12mo ed: c 13] (still in force)
 Prelacy Act 1689 (c 4) [12mo ed: c 3] (still in force)

1690
 Confession of Faith Ratification Act 1690 (c 7) [12mo ed: c 5] (still in force)
 Judicial Sale Act 1690 (c 49) [12mo ed: c 20]
 Confirmation Act 1690 (c 56) [12mo ed: c 26] (still in force)
 Udal Tenure Act 1690 (c 61) [12mo ed: c 32] (see Udal law) (repealed by the Abolition of Feudal Tenure etc. (Scotland) Act 2000)
 Teinds Act 1690 (c 63) [12mo ed: c 30] (repealed by the Abolition of Feudal Tenure etc. (Scotland) Act 2000)

1693
 Citation Act 1693 (c 21) [12mo ed: c 12] (still in force)
 Real Rights Act 1693 (c 22) [12mo ed: c 13] (still in force)
 Register of Sasines Act 1693 (c 23) [12mo ed: c 14] (see sasine) (still in force)
 Registration Act 1693 (c 24) [12mo ed: c 15] (still in force)
 Interlocutors Act 1693 (c 31) [12mo ed: c 18]
 Ministers Act 1693 (c 38) [12mo ed: c 22] (still in force)
 Removings Act 1693 (c 40) [12mo ed: c 24] (still in force)
 Court of Session Act 1693 (c 42) [12mo ed: c 26] (see Court of Session) (still in force)
 Criminal Procedure Act 1693 (c 43) [12mo ed: c 27]

1695
 Cautioners Act 1695 (c 7) [12mo ed: c 5]
 Judicial Sale Act 1695 (c 8) [12mo ed: c 6]
 Act for a Company Tradeing to Affrica and the Indies. (c 10) [12mo ed: c 8] Company of Scotland Act (see Company of Scotland) 
 Act against Blasphemy 1695 (c 11)
 Runrig Lands Act 1695 (c 36) [12mo ed: c 23] (see run rig) (still in force)
 Act anent Executry and Moveables (c 41)
 Soil Preservation Act 1695 (c 54) [12mo ed c 30] (Act for Preservation of Meadowes Lands and Pasturages lying adjacent to sand hills)
 Division of Commonties Act 1695 (c 69) [12mo ed: c 38] (still in force)
 Act anent Letters passing the Signet (c 71) [12mo ed c. 40]
 Confirmation Act 1695 (c 72) [12mo ed: c 41] (still in force)
 Act for Erecting a Publick Bank (c 88) (Act for erecting a Bank in Scotland) (see Bank of Scotland)

1696
 Bankruptcy Act 1696  (c 5) [12mo ed: c 5] (Act for Declaring nottour Bankrupt)
 Tutors and Curators Act 1696 (c 8) [12mo ed: c 8] (repealed 1991 (c. 50))
 Prescription Act 1696  (c 9) [12mo ed: c 9] 
 Act in favors of Universities Schools and Hospitalls (c 14)
 Deeds Act 1696 (c 15) [12mo ed: c 15] (repealed by Requirements of Writing (Scotland) Act 1995 (c 7))
 Act anent Registration of Seasins and other writts and diligences (c. 18)
 Interuptions Act 1696 (c 19) [12mo ed: c 19]
 Vitious Intromitters Act 1696 (c 20) [12mo ed: c 20] (still in force)
 Blank Bonds and Trusts Act 1696 (c 25) [12mo ed: c 25] (repealed by the Requirements of Writing (Scotland) Act 1995 (c 7))
 Education Act 1696 (c 26)
 Salmon Act 1696 (c 35) [12mo ed: c 33]
 Inland Bills Act 1696 (c 38) [12mo ed: c 36] (still in force)
 Registration Act 1696 (c 41) [12mo ed: c 39] (still in force)

1698
 Act for preventing of disorders in the Supplying and Planting of vacant Churches (c 2)
 Act against Pocknet fishing upon the Water of Forth (c 3)
 Registration Act 1698 (c 4) [12mo ed: c 4] (repealed by the Requirements of Writing (Scotland) Act 1995 (c 7))
 Act against Clandestine and Irregular Marriages (c 6)
 Act for the Ease of small Vassalls of Bishops Lands now holden of the King (c 11)
 Act for preserving of Planting (c 35) [12mo ed c 16]
 Act for settling the Communication of Trade (c 39) [12mo ed: c 20]

18th century

1701
 Criminal Procedure Act 1701 (c 6) [12mo ed: c 6] (Act for preventing wrongous Imprisonments and against undue delayes in Tryals) (still in force)
 Liberation Act 1701 (c 6)

1702
 Act Declaring the present meeting of Parliament to be a lawfull and free Parliament (c 4)

1703
 Act Anent Peace and War
 Act Ratifieing the turning of the Meeting of the Estates in the year 1689, into a Parliament (c 3)
 Wine Act

1704
Act for the additional representation of barons
Act of Security 1704

1705
 Fisheries Act 1705 (c 48) [12mo ed: c 2] (still in force)
 Act for a Treaty with England 1705 (c 50) (see Acts of Union 1707)

1707
 Protestant Religion and Presbyterian Church Act 1707 (c 6) [12mo ed: c 6] (also known as the Act of Security 1707) (still in force)
 Union with England Act 1707 (c 7) [12mo ed: c. 7] (see Acts of Union 1707) (still in force)
 Election Act 1707 (c 8) [12mo ed: c 8] (repealed by the Electoral Administration Act 2006)
 Act for Preserving the Game (c 13)

See also
List of legislation in the United Kingdom

References
 Scottish law: Scottish legislation pre 1707

External links

 RPS  (Records of the Parliaments of Scotland)
 UK Statute Law Database results for pre-Union Scottish Acts, as amended and in force today, also has text of those still in force in 1991 which have since been repealed.
 Act-Of-Union-1707

 
Scotland
Scotland law-related lists
Scotland politics-related lists
Scottish history-related lists
England–Scotland relations